Escorpión de Primavera is the debut studio album by Colombian singer-songwriter Anasol, released in 1999 in an independent label called Pato Records.

Track listing

References

1999 albums
Anasol albums